Mamadee Nyepon (born April 26, 1992) is an Ivorian footballer who last played for the Carolina Dynamo in the Premier Development League.

Career

Youth, College and Amateur
Nyepon played four years of college soccer at the High Point University between 2011 and 2014.

Nyepon also appeared for Premier Development League side Carolina Dynamo in from 2012 to 2014.

Professional
Nyepon signed for North American Soccer League side Carolina RailHawks on April 16, 2015.

References

External links
USL 2 bio
Panthers bio

1992 births
Living people
Ivorian footballers
Ivorian expatriate footballers
High Point Panthers men's soccer players
North Carolina Fusion U23 players
North Carolina FC players
Association football forwards
Expatriate soccer players in the United States
USL League Two players
North American Soccer League players
Footballers from Abidjan